Invisible is a 2015 Filipino drama film directed by Lawrence Fajardo. It was screened in the Contemporary World Cinema section of the 2015 Toronto International Film Festival.

Cast
 Allen Dizon
 Ces Quesada
 Bernardo Bernardo
 JM de Guzman
 JC Santos
 Onyl Torres
 Mailes Kanapi

References

External links
 

2015 films
2015 drama films
Philippine drama films
Filipino-language films